A myocardial bridge (MB) is a congenital heart defect in which one of the coronary arteries tunnels through the heart muscle itself (myocardium). In normal patients, the coronary arteries rest on top of the heart muscle and feed blood down into smaller vessels (ex. septal arteries) which then take blood into the heart muscle itself (i.e. populate throughout the myocardium). However, if a band of muscle forms around one of the coronary arteries during the fetal stage of development, then a myocardial bridge is formed – a "bridge" of heart muscle over the artery. Each time the heart squeezes to pump blood, the band of muscle exerts pressure and constricts the artery, reducing blood flow to the heart. This defect is present from birth. It is important to note that even a very thin ex. <1 mm and/or short ex. 20 mm MB can cause significant symptoms. MBs can range from a few mm in length to 10 cm or more. The overall prevalence of myocardial bridge is 19%, although its prevalence found by autopsy is much higher (42%).

Symptoms and signs
While many people have very tiny myocardial bridges that cause no symptoms, others have longer and/or deeper bridges causing significant symptoms, including children. For example, some patients cannot run or exercise at all, others can exercise despite symptoms such as shortness of breath or feelings of tightness in the chest, and still others find improvement of symptoms during exercise. Many competitive athletes have had severe myocardial bridges and unroofing surgery.

The symptoms of myocardial bridges differ slightly from patient to patient depending on the length, depth, and location of the bridge. Common symptoms include:
 Dizziness
 Shortness of breath
 Fatigue
 Chest pain/angina
 Palpitations/arrhythmia i.e. irregular heart rhythm
 Squeezing/tightness/pressure/pain in chest, shoulder, jaw, armpit, neck, and/or down the arm
 Inability to exercise, walk, do chores, have to sit/lie down
 Feeling like chest is “going to explode”
 Feeling of something “clamping down” in the chest
 Fainting/passing out and/or feeling like one is about to faint

Complications
Myocardial bridges can cause numerous complications – which are often as misunderstood in the medical community as the condition itself. These include:
 angina pectoris (chest pain radiating from the heart)
 endothelial dysfunction, which causes vasospasms – both sometimes very severe
 arrhythmia (irregular heartbeats)
 tachycardia (abnormally high heart rate)
 plaque forming just before (proximal to) the myocardial bridge

Note that studies have shown that plaque does not form inside myocardial bridges, yet there is virtually always plaque just before the myocardial bridge in adults.

Some common triggers of myocardial bridge symptoms are:
 exertion/exercise
 anything that raises the heart rate, even positive events
 low-oxygen environments ex. hot humid weather, high altitude
 sitting/lying/doing nothing for long periods

Notably, high heart rate or tachycardia greatly increases ischemia (low oxygen to the heart) caused by myocardial bridges. Studies such as Ripa et al., 2007  have shown that this is because the compressed artery reopens only very slowly each heartbeat and thus stays in a state of semi-compression for most or all of the diastolic period. Thus as the heart rate increases, the time the artery has to reopen (diastolic period) decreases dramatically – to the point that with very high heart rates, the artery never fully reopens and blood flow is constantly reduced.

Diagnosis
There are three key tests currently used to diagnose myocardial bridges by Stanford University: CT scan, cardiac catheterization, and stress ultrasound.
 CT scan – on which the myocardial bridge often appears as a compressed or squashed area of the artery in which, notably, the fatty areas surrounding the artery (shown in black on CT scans) disappear, since the artery is tunneling through muscle not fat in this area. CTs often allow an assessment of an approximate length and depth of the myocardial bridge, but compression cannot be assessed accurately from a CT scan.
 IVUS cardiac catheterization including dFFR measured during dobutamine challenge – from which readings of dFFR and percentage compression as well as measurements of the approximate length and depth (shown as the halo or echolucent band) of the MB are taken. It is critical to note that in order to be meaningful in diagnosing a myocardial bridge, it is critical to measure dFFR i.e. the diastolic period, not mean FFR. This is because, contrary to a common misconception, myocardial bridges cause compression of the artery during diastole as well as systole, as explained above. This has been shown in multiple studies. It is also critical that the dobutamine challenge be used, elevating the heart rate, because dFFR decreases significantly at high heart rates as shown by Yoshino et al., 2014.
 Stress echocardiogram (i.e. before and after running on a treadmill) – used to identify evidence of ischemia i.e. a lack of oxygen delivered to the ventricle due to the MB. This test does not visualize the MB itself but rather its effects on the ventricle. Multiple studies have shown that ischemia from MBs is indicated by the appearance "septal buckling" in the stress echocardiogram, as the septum gives out under stress., which a 2013 paper by Lin et al. describes as "a transient focal buckling in the end-systolic to early-diastolic motion of the septum with apical sparing which correlates prospectively with the presence of LAD MB."

As much of the science of testing for MBs is relatively new, patients frequently go undiagnosed. Stanford's center for myocardial bridges has offered second opinion services from a distance for some ten years, including to numerous international patients.

Notably, EKG is not a reliable or conclusive diagnostic tool for diagnosing MBs. Some symptomatic MB patients show normal EKG results and others abnormal.

Many doctors have suggested that there is a need for more awareness of MBs among doctors and better testing, including testing of young people as the disease is congenital. According to a 2007 study by Ripa et al.: 
"Clinical suspicion of a myocardial bridge would be warranted in all cases of typical or atypical chest pain in subjects who have a low probability of atherosclerosis because they are free from the traditional cardiovascular risk factors, particularly in the young."

In a 2017 article in Stanford Medical Center's official blog Scope, Dr. Ingela Schnittger stated:
"Many of these patients have these heartbreaking stories to tell. They can’t hold a job, they can’t travel, they can’t take care of their families. Most cardiologists are completely at a loss. They know myocardial bridges exist, but they have been taught they are benign and never cause problems... When these patients go to the ER, and they go there a lot, all the cardiology tests come back normal. They’re told, 'Here’s a little Valium. I think you’re anxious.' They get belittled, not taken seriously, and they get really depressed."

Treatment
Myotomy, commonly known as unroofing surgery, is the first-line surgical treatment for myocardial bridges. It is the only treatment that actually removes the myocardial bridge itself, releasing the artery from compression. Unroofing surgery today is done via open heart (sternum), thoracotomy (through the ribs), and also using robot-assisted surgery (through tiny keyholes in the chest). Full open heart surgery is usually reserved for very large myocardial bridges and/or specific situations that make thoracotomy difficult. By far, Stanford University has done more unroofing surgeries than any other hospital in the world, with over 200 unroofings completed since starting a decade ago. In 2019, University of Chicago surgeon Dr. Husam Balkhy emerged as a provider of robotic-assisted unroofing surgery, with some patients being possible candidates for this route.

If done properly, unroofing removes the entire band of muscle affecting the artery, restoring more blood flow. Stanford University Medical Center's 2016 study by Pargaonkar et al. showed that unroofing surgery “significantly improves anginal symptoms” and improves “all five dimensions of the SAQ” i.e. Seattle Angina Questionnaire. Some residual symptoms caused by complications from a lifetime of living with a myocardial bridge may continue after unroofing surgery such as endothelial dysfunction, vasospasm, plaque, narrowed artery. However, these often improve slowly over a year or more once the myocardial bridge is gone.

A few cases have occurred in various hospitals in which patients have not been completely unroofed, leaving segments of the MB, resulting in lingering symptoms.

A critical point is that the endothelial dysfunction and vasospasms caused by myocardial bridges cannot start to heal until unroofing surgery is done, because the MB continues to squeeze on the artery, damaging the artery lining.

Bypass surgery is not the first line treatment for myocardial bridges for two main reasons:
 Competitive flow problem – blood can flow the wrong way i.e. continue to flow down the original artery instead of the new artery that has been grafted on.
 Jailed septal arteries still jailed – a jailed artery is a septal artery (a branch off the coronary artery) that lies inside the myocardial bridge and is thus also compressed with each heartbeat. Septal arteries are critical as they carry blood into the heart septum. Bypass surgery alone does not remedy jailed septal arteries, which still do not get blood flow.

Notably, many myocardial bridge patients have had bypass surgery only to later need unroofing surgery after the bypass proved unsuccessful.

However, papers by Ekeke et al., 2015  and others have shown bypass surgery is helpful as an addition to supplement unroofing surgery, but only when there is significant plaque just before (proximal to) the myocardial bridge or anatomic anomalies increase the risk of recurrence of such plaque.

A 2013 Russian study by Bockeria et al. concludes that this competitive flow problem is much more likely to occur if the LIMA artery is used for the graft rather than the SVG, so the SVG is recommended.

Stents are never indicated as a treatment for myocardial bridges because trials have shown they are prone to breaking when the artery is squeezed each heartbeat.

Unroofing surgery has been performed in the United States, Belgium, Spain, Italy, England, China, Russia, United Arab Emirates among other countries. Hospitals that have performed unroofing surgery include:
 Stanford University Medical Center – surgeon Dr. Jack Boyd; team leader Dr. Ingela Schnittger
 University of Chicago Medical Center – surgeon Dr. Husam Balkhy
 Mayo Clinic, Rochester, Minnesota
 Cleveland Clinic
 Cleveland Clinic Abu Dhabi – surgeon Dr. Johannes Bonatti (currently in Austria)
 Texas Heart Institute
 Kaiser Permanente, Santa Clara, CA – Dr. David Scoville
 Baylor Scott and White Hospital, Texas – surgeon Dr. Jeffrey Wu
 Spectrum Health Butterworth Hospital, Michigan – Dr. Marzia Leacche
 Hospital de las Cruces, Barakaldo, Basque Country, Spain – Dr. Crespo and Dr. Aramendi
 Istanbul University Hospital – Dr. Ihsan Bakir
° St Francis Hospital and Heart, NYC- Dr Newell Robinson

In many other countries, including a number of highly developed countries such as the UK, Australia, New Zealand, Ireland, Sweden, and Singapore, unroofing surgery for myocardial bridges remains unavailable, and in some, the condition remains unrecognized as a medical problem.

Prevalence
The true prevalence of MBs is still largely unknown, as studies have made vastly different assessments. As a 2017 Stanford paper by Rogers, et al. points out:

History
According to Stanford University Medical Center, MBs are often misunderstood by doctors, who may have been taught that the condition is always benign. As a result, patients are often denied treatment. But a great deal of science has emerged in the past decade to clarify the condition. In particular, Stanford has published over 15 articles on MBs since 2014. One commonly recurring reason for denial of treatment is the myth that myocardial bridges do not significantly affect blood flow. But this myth has been debunked by Stanford and also Daoud and Wafa 2012 who say:

In other words, while the myocardial bridge itself only compresses the artery while the heart squeezes (systolic period), which is only 15% of the time in the heartbeat cycle, in fact, the artery stays compressed long after the heart relaxes. This is because arteries are sturdy and pliable, so after being compressed they are very slow to reopen, remaining in some level of semi-compression for most if not all of the diastolic period i.e. the other 85% of the heartbeat cycle (hence the critical need for dFFR testing in diagnosing myocardial bridges). Thus the coronary artery is fully open to allow normal blood flow for only a small percentage of each heartbeat cycle. This problem is further exacerbated by tachycardia (high heart rate), which can bring the duration of normal blood flow to zero, as explained below. Dr. Ingela Schnittger, head of the Myocardial Bridge Research Center at Stanford, has appeared on BBC Radio to explain this.

See also
 Cardiac CT
 Angiography

References 

Heart diseases